Monge is a surname. Notable people with the surname include:

 Carlos Monge Medrano (1884–1970), Peruvian physician
 Carlos Velásquez Monge, Guatemalan politician
 Chucho Monge (1910–1964), Mexican composer
 Edgard Monge (born 1965), Nicaraguan man convicted of assault for having unprotected sex without disclosing that he was HIV positive
 Emiliano Monge (born 1978), Mexican writer and novelist
 Fabian Monge (born 2001), Australian soccer player
 Félix Arcadio Montero Monge (1850–1897), Costa Rican lawyer, politician and union leader
 Gaspard Monge (1746–1818), French mathematician, politician and Comte de Péluse (Count of Pelusium)
 Janet Monge, American anthropologist, academic and museum curator
 Jean-Baptiste Monge (born 1971), French author and illustrator
 Joaquín García Monge (1881–1958), Costa Rican writer
 Johnny Araya Monge (born 1957), Costa Rican politician
 Jorge Hernán Monge (1938–2019), Costa Rican footballer
 José Trías Monge (1920–2003), Puerto Rican lawyer and judge
 Josue Monge (born 1999), Costa Rican footballer
 Jules Monge (1855–1934), French painter
 Julian Monge Najera (born 1960), Costa Rican ecologist, editor, educator and photographer
 Louis de Monge (1890–1977), Belgian engineer
 Lucia Monge, Peruvian artist, academic and writer
 Luis Monge (footballer) (born 1992), Argentine footballer
 Luis Monge (mass murderer) (1918–1967), American mass murderer
 Luis Alberto Monge (1925–2016), Costa Rican politician and President of Costa Rica from 1982 to 1986
 Manuel Monge (military figure) (born 1938), Portuguese general and politician
 Mauro Monges (born 1983), Paraguayan footballer
 Mario Monge (1938–2009), Salvadoran footballer
 Melissa Herrera Monge (born 1996), Costa Rican footballer
 Néstor Monge (born 1990), Costa Rican footballer
 Peter Monge, American academic and consultant
 Priscilla Monge (born 1968), Costa Rican artist
 Rolando Araya Monge (born 1947), Costa Rican politician
 Sid Monge (born 1951), Mexican baseball player
 Silvia Monge Villalobos (born 1967), Mexican politician
 Ventura Monge Domínguez (1914–1937), Spanish army officer
 Whitney Mongé (born 1987), American musician
 Yolandita Monge (born 1955), Puerto Rican singer, songwriter, and actress
 Zarela Villanueva Monge (born 1952), Costa Rican lawyer and judge